Raymond Daniel Manzarek Jr. ( Manczarek; February 12, 1939 – May 20, 2013) was an American keyboardist. He is best known as a member of the Doors, co-founding the band with singer and lyricist Jim Morrison in 1965.

Manzarek was inducted into the Rock and Roll Hall of Fame in 1993 as a member of the Doors. He was a co-founding member of Nite City from 1977 to 1978, and of Manzarek–Krieger from 2001 until his death in 2013. USA Today described him as "one of the best keyboardists ever".

Biography

Early life 
Raymond Daniel Manczarek Jr. was born and raised on the South Side of Chicago, Illinois. He was born to parents of Polish descent, Helena Kolenda (1918–2012) and Raymond Manczarek Sr. (1914–1987). His grandparents emigrated from Poland in the 1890s.

Upon graduating from St. Rita of Cascia High School in 1956, Manzarek matriculated at DePaul University, where he played piano in his fraternity's jazz band (the Beta Pi Mu Combo), participated in intramural football, served as treasurer of the Speech Club, and organized a charity concert with Sonny Rollins and Dave Brubeck. He graduated from the University's College of Commerce with a degree in economics in 1960.

In late-1961, Manzarek briefly enrolled at the University of California, Los Angeles School of Law. Unable to acclimatize to the curriculum, he transferred to the Department of Motion Pictures, Television and Radio as a graduate student before dropping out altogether after breaking up with a girlfriend. Although he attempted to enlist in the Army Signal Corps as a camera operator, he was instead assigned to the highly selective Army Security Agency as a prospective intelligence analyst.

The Doors 
Following his return to the United States, he re-enrolled in UCLA's graduate film program in 1962, where he received a Master of Fine Arts degree in cinematography in 1965. During this period, he met future wife Dorothy Fujikawa and undergraduate film student Jim Morrison. At the time, Manzarek was in a band called Rick & the Ravens with his brothers Rick and Jim. Forty days after finishing film school, thinking they had gone their separate ways, Manzarek and Morrison met by chance on Venice Beach in California. Morrison said he had written some songs, and Manzarek expressed an interest in hearing them, whereupon Morrison sang rough versions of "Moonlight Drive", "My Eyes Have Seen You" and "Summer's Almost Gone". During this time, Manzarek also met teenage guitarist Robby Krieger and drummer John Densmore at a Transcendental Meditation lecture and recruited them for the incipient band. Densmore said, "There wouldn't be any Doors without Maharishi."

In January 1966, the Doors became the house band at the London Fog on the Sunset Strip. According to Manzarek, "Nobody ever came in the place... an occasional sailor or two on leave, a few drunks. All in all it was a very depressing experience, but it gave us time to really get the music together". When the Doors were fired from the London Fog, they were hired to be the house band at the Whisky a Go Go. The Doors' first recording contract was with Columbia Records. After a few months of inactivity, they learned they were on Columbia's drop list. At that point, they asked to be released from their contract. Following a few months of live gigs, Jac Holzman "rediscovered" the Doors and signed them to Elektra Records.

The Doors lacked a bass guitarist (except during recording sessions), so for live performances Manzarek played the bass parts on a Fender Rhodes piano keyboard bass. His signature sound was that of the Vox Continental combo organ, an instrument used by many other psychedelic rock bands of the era. He also used a Gibson G-101 Kalamazoo combo organ (which looks like a Farfisa) for the band's later albums.

During the Morrison era, Manzarek was the group's regular backing vocalist. He occasionally sang lead, as exemplified by covers of Muddy Waters's "Close to You" (released on 1970's Absolutely Live) and "You Need Meat (Don't Go No Further)" (recorded during the L.A. Woman sessions and initially released as the B-side of "Love Her Madly"). He went on to share lead vocals with Krieger on the albums (Other Voices and Full Circle) released after Morrison's death.

Later career and influence 

After recording two solo albums on Mercury Records to a muted reception in 1974, Manzarek played in several groups, most notably Nite City. He recorded a rock adaptation of Carl Orff's Carmina Burana (1983; co-produced by Philip Glass), briefly played with Iggy Pop, sat in on one track on the eponymous 1987 album Echo & the Bunnymen, backed San Francisco poet Michael McClure's poetry readings and worked on improvisational compositions with poet Michael C. Ford. He also worked extensively with Hearts of Fire screenwriter and former SRC front man Scott Richardson on a series of spoken word and blues recordings entitled "Tornado Souvenirs". Manzarek produced the first four albums of the seminal punk band X, also contributing occasionally on keyboards. Two of those have been also included on Rolling Stones 500 Greatest Albums of All Time.

His memoir, Light My Fire: My Life with the Doors, was published in 1998. The Poet in Exile (2001) is a novel exploring the urban legend that Jim Morrison may have faked his death. Manzarek's second novel, Snake Moon, released in April 2006, is a Civil War ghost story. In 2000, a collaboration poetry album entitled Freshly Dug was released with British singer, poet, actor and pioneer punk rocker Darryl Read. Read had previously worked with Manzarek on the Beat Existentialist album in 1994, and their last poetical and musical collaboration was in 2007 with the album Bleeding Paradise. Also in 2000, he co-wrote and directed the film Love Her Madly, which was credited to a story idea by Jim Morrison. The film was shown at the closing night of the 2004 Santa Cruz Film Festival, but otherwise received limited distribution and critical review.

In 2006, he collaborated with composer and trumpeter Bal. The album that resulted, Atonal Head, is an exploration in the realm of electronica. The two musicians integrated jazz, rock, ethnic and classical music into their computer-based creations. On August 4, 2007, Manzarek hosted a program on BBC Radio 2 about the 40th anniversary of the recording of "Light My Fire" and the group's musical and spiritual influences.

In April 2009, Manzarek and Robby Krieger appeared as special guests for Daryl Hall's monthly concert webcast Live From Daryl's House. They performed several Doors tunes ("People Are Strange", "The Crystal Ship", "Roadhouse Blues" and "Break on Through (To the Other Side)") with Hall providing lead vocals. In his last years, he often sat in with local bands in the Napa County area, where he relocated in the early 2000s.

In 2009, Manzarek collaborated with "Weird Al" Yankovic by playing keyboards on the single "Craigslist", which is a pastiche of the Doors. On the day of Manzarek's death, Yankovic published a personal video of this studio session which he said had been an "extreme honor" and "one of the absolute high points of my life". In May 2010, Manzarek recorded with slide guitarist Roy Rogers. A collaborative album between the two, entitled Translucent Blues, was released in mid-2011; its lyrical content is primarily penned by songwriter/poets Jim Carroll and Michael McClure. During June through August 2011, Manzarek recorded "Breakn' a Sweat" with DJ Skrillex and his fellow former Doors members Robby Krieger and John Densmore. In August 2013, Twisted Tales, another Manzarek–Rogers collaboration, was released and dedicated to Manzarek after his passing.

Personal life, death, and legacy 

Manzarek married fellow UCLA alumna Dorothy Aiko Fujikawa in Los Angeles on December 21, 1967, with Jim Morrison and his longtime companion Pamela Courson as witnesses. Manzarek and Fujikawa remained married until his death. They have a son, Pablo, born on August 28, 1973, and they have three grandchildren. In the early-1970s, the Manzareks divided their time between an apartment in West Hollywood, California, and a small penthouse on New York City's Upper West Side. They subsequently resided in Beverly Hills, California (including ten years in a house on Rodeo Drive), for several decades. For the last decade of his life, Manzarek and his wife lived in a refurbished farmhouse near Vichy Springs, California, in the Napa Valley.

In March 2013, Manzarek was diagnosed with a rare cancer called cholangiocarcinoma (bile duct cancer) and traveled to Germany for special treatment. During that time, prior to his death, he reconciled with Densmore and spoke to Krieger. He also performed a private concert for his doctors and nurses. Manzarek was "feeling better" until things took a turn for the worse, according to his manager. On May 20, 2013, Manzarek died at a hospital in Rosenheim, Germany, at the age of 74. He was surrounded by his wife and brothers. Krieger said upon hearing the news of his death, "I was deeply saddened to hear about the passing of my friend and bandmate Ray Manzarek today. I'm just glad to have been able to have played Doors songs with him for the last decade. Ray was a huge part of my life and I will always miss him." Densmore said, "There was no keyboard player on the planet more appropriate to support Jim Morrison's words. Ray, I felt totally in sync with you musically. It was like we were of one mind, holding down the foundation for Robby and Jim to float on top of. I will miss my musical brother."

Greg Harris, president and CEO of the Rock and Roll Hall of Fame, said in reaction to Manzarek's death that "The world of rock 'n' roll lost one of its greats with the passing of Ray Manzarek." Harris also said that "he was instrumental in shaping one of the most influential, controversial and revolutionary groups of the 1960s. Such memorable tracks as "Light My Fire", "People Are Strange" and "Hello, I Love You"—to name but a few—owe much to Manzarek's innovative playing."

On February 12, 2016, at the Fonda Theatre in Hollywood, Densmore and Krieger reunited for the first time in 15 years to perform in tribute to Manzarek and benefit Stand Up to Cancer. That day would have been Manzarek's 77th birthday. The night featured Exene Cervenka and John Doe of the band X, Rami Jaffee of the Foo Fighters, Stone Temple Pilots' Robert DeLeo, Jane's Addiction's Stephen Perkins, Emily Armstrong of Dead Sara, and Andrew Watt (among others).

In April 2018, the film Break On Thru: A Celebration of Ray Manzarek and the Doors premiered at the 2018 Asbury Park Music & Film Festival. The film highlights the 2016 concert in honor of what would have been Manzarek's 79th birthday, and it includes new footage and interviews. The film won the APMFF Best Film Feature Award at the festival.

Discography 
Details are taken from AllMusic.

The Doors

Solo
 The Golden Scarab (1974)
 The Whole Thing Started with Rock & Roll Now It's Out of Control (1974)
 Carmina Burana (1983)
 Love Her Madly (2006)

Nite City
 Nite City (1977)
 Starwood Club, Los Angeles. 02/23/1977 (1977)
 Golden Days Diamond Nights (1978)

With X
 Los Angeles (1978)
With Piotr Bal
 Atonal Head (2006)

With Echo & the Bunnymen
 "Bedbugs and Ballyhoo" (1987)

With Michael McClure
 Love Lion (1993)
 The Piano Poems: Live From San Francisco (2012)

With Darryl Read
 Freshly Dug (1999)

With Roy Rogers
 Ballads Before The Rain (2008)
 Translucent Blues (2011)
 Twisted Tales (2013)

Spoken word
 The Doors: Myth And Reality, The Spoken Word History (1996)

With "Weird Al" Yankovic
"Craigslist" (2009)

With poet Michael C. Ford
 Look Each Other in The Ears. Hen House Studio Album includes The Doors : Ray Manzarek, Robby Krieger, and John Densmore. 2014

Filmography 
Love Her Madly (2000). Director and co-writer.
Induction (1965). Actor (Ray), director, and writer.
The Wino and the Blind Man (1964). Actor (blind man).
Evergreen (1965). Writer and Director.
Deal of the Century (1983). Actor (Charlie Simbo).
The Poet in Exile (in production).

Books 
 Light My Fire: My Life with the Doors (1999) 
 The Poet in Exile (2001) Thunder's Mouth Press, 2002 paperback: 
 Snake Moon (2006)

In popular culture
For director Oliver Stone's film The Doors (1991), Manzarek was portrayed by Kyle MacLachlan.

References

Bibliography

External links 
 Ray Manzarek official website
 
 The Doors official website
 

1939 births
2013 deaths
American expatriates in the United Kingdom
American rock keyboardists
American rock singers
Record producers from Illinois
The Doors members
Songwriters from California
American male singers
American rock pianists
American blues pianists
American male pianists
American jazz pianists
American jazz keyboardists
DePaul University alumni
UCLA Film School alumni
Singers from Chicago
People from Napa, California
American people of Polish descent
Deaths from cancer in Germany
Deaths from cholangiocarcinoma
American organists
American male organists
Musicians from Los Angeles
Record producers from California
Film directors from Los Angeles
Jazz musicians from Illinois
Elektra Records artists
American male jazz musicians
People from the Upper West Side
21st-century American keyboardists
20th-century American keyboardists
Jazz musicians from California
Jazz musicians from New York (state)
Nite City members